The 1998–99 NBA season was the Rockets' 32nd season in the National Basketball Association, and 28th season in Houston. On March 23, 1998, the owners of all 29 NBA teams voted 27–2 to reopen the league's collective bargaining agreement, seeking changes to the league's salary cap system, and a ceiling on individual player salaries. The National Basketball Players Association (NBPA) opposed to the owners' plan, and wanted raises for players who earned the league's minimum salary. After both sides failed to reach an agreement, the owners called for a lockout, which began on July 1, 1998, putting a hold on all team trades, free agent signings and training camp workouts, and cancelling many NBA regular season and preseason games. Due to the lockout, the NBA All-Star Game, which was scheduled to be played in Philadelphia on February 14, 1999, was also cancelled. However, on January 6, 1999, NBA commissioner David Stern, and NBPA director Billy Hunter finally reached an agreement to end the lockout. The deal was approved by both the players and owners, and was signed on January 20, ending the lockout after 204 days. The regular season began on February 5, and was cut short to just 50 games instead of the regular 82-game schedule.

To replace the retiring Clyde Drexler, the Rockets acquired All-Star forward, and six-time champion Scottie Pippen from the Chicago Bulls, and signed free agent Antoine Carr, who appeared in two NBA Finals appearances with the Utah Jazz. Pippen, Hakeem Olajuwon and Charles Barkley had previously played together on the U.S. Men's basketball team in the 1996 Olympics in Atlanta. With the addition of Pippen, the Rockets got off to a 6–2 start, but then lost five of their next seven games. At midseason, the team traded second-year guard Rodrick Rhodes to the Vancouver Grizzlies in exchange for three-point specialist, and former Rockets guard Sam Mack. The Rockets played solid basketball posting a nine-game winning streak in March, and finished third in the Midwest Division with a 31–19 record. The Rockets had the fifth best team offensive rating in the NBA.

Olajuwon averaged 18.9 points, 9.6 rebounds and 2.5 blocks per game, and was named to the All-NBA Third Team, while Barkley averaged 16.1 points and led the team with 12.3 rebounds per game, and Pippen provided the team with 14.5 points, 6.5 rebounds, 5.9 assists and 2.0 steals per game. In addition, top draft pick Michael Dickerson provided with 10.9 points per game, while second round draft pick Cuttino Mobley contributed 9.9 points per game, as both players were selected to the NBA All-Rookie Second Team. Off the bench, Othella Harrington averaged 9.8 points and 6.4 rebounds per game, and Brent Price contributed 7.3 points and 2.8 assists per game. Three-point specialist Matt Maloney only played just 15 games this season due to an elbow injury.

However, in the Western Conference First Round of the playoffs, the Rockets lost one game to three to the Los Angeles Lakers. After the defeat, the Rockets would not return to the playoffs until 2004. Pippen spent only one season with the Rockets, as he and Barkley had trouble getting along as teammates. Following the season, Pippen was traded to the Portland Trail Blazers, while Dickerson, Harrington, Carr and Price were all traded to the Vancouver Grizzlies, Mack and Maloney were both released to free agency, as Maloney signed as a free agent with the Chicago Bulls midway through the next season, and Eddie Johnson retired.

Offseason

Draft picks

Roster

Regular season

Season standings

z – clinched division title
y – clinched division title
x – clinched playoff spot

Record vs. opponents

Game log

Playoffs

|- align="center" bgcolor="#ffcccc"
| 1
| May 9
| @ L.A. Lakers
| L 100–101
| Charles Barkley (25)
| Barkley, Pippen (10)
| Scottie Pippen (8)
| Great Western Forum17,505
| 0–1
|- align="center" bgcolor="#ffcccc"
| 2
| May 11
| @ L.A. Lakers
| L 98–110
| Sam Mack (20)
| Charles Barkley (13)
| Scottie Pippen (5)
| Great Western Forum17,505
| 0–2
|- align="center" bgcolor="#ccffcc"
| 3
| May 13
| L.A. Lakers
| W 102–88
| Scottie Pippen (37)
| Charles Barkley (23)
| Brent Price (7)
| Compaq Center16,285
| 1–2
|- align="center" bgcolor="#ffcccc"
| 4
| May 15
| L.A. Lakers
| L 88–98
| Charles Barkley (20)
| Scottie Pippen (17)
| Charles Barkley (6)
| Compaq Center16,285
| 1–3
|-

Player statistics

NOTE: Please write the players statistics in alphabetical order by last name.

Season

Playoffs

Awards and records

Awards
 Hakeem Olajuwon, All-NBA Third Team
 Michael Dickerson, NBA All-Rookie Team Second Team
 Cuttino Mobley, NBA All-Rookie Team Second Team

Records

Transactions

Trades

Free agents

Additions

Subtractions

See also
 1998–99 NBA season

References

Houston Rockets seasons